Horace Green (23 April 1918 – July 2000) was an English professional footballer who made 367 appearances in the Football League playing for Halifax Town and Lincoln City. He played as a right half or full back.

Life and career
Green was born in Barnsley, Yorkshire. He began his football career with Worsbrough Bridge Old Boys, before joining Football League Third Division North club Halifax Town in July 1936. He made his debut in the 1937–38 season, and remained with the club until February 1949, although the Second World War interrupted his league career for seven years. He moved on to Lincoln City, where he was a regular in the starting eleven for five years, making his last first-team appearance in October 1954.

Green died in July 2000.

References

1918 births
2000 deaths
Footballers from Barnsley
English footballers
Association football wing halves
Association football fullbacks
Halifax Town A.F.C. players
Lincoln City F.C. players
English Football League players
Place of death missing